Amnesty is a 2011 Albanian drama film written and directed by Bujar Alimani. The film was selected as the Albanian entry for the Best Foreign Language Film at the 84th Academy Awards, but it did not make the final shortlist.

Plot
Elsa (Luli Bitri) is a woman with two children, recently unemployed, and living in post-communist Pogradec, Albania in grim circumstances. She is helped by her father-in-law Remzi (Todi Llupi). Her husband is in prison in Tirana for gambling and debt issues. The prison institutes a conjugal visit program, and during her visits she meets and falls in love with another conjugal visit participant Shpetim (Karafil Shena), whose wife is in prison for forging immigration certificates. Elsa becomes friends with Maya (Mirela Naska), whose recent husband is also in prison, and Maya helps Elsa to get a job at a hospital kitchen and a place to live in Tirana. Elsa's increasing independence and relationship with Shpetim creates problems with Remzi. Then a prisoner amnesty where the imprisoned spouses are released early threatens the bond between Elsa and Shpetim.

Cast
 Luli Bitri as Elsa 
 Karafil Shena as Shpetim
 Todi Llupi as Remzi
 Mirela Naska as Maya

See also
 List of submissions to the 84th Academy Awards for Best Foreign Language Film
 List of Albanian submissions for the Academy Award for Best Foreign Language Film

References

External links
 

2011 films
Albanian drama films
Albanian-language films
2011 drama films